Melanophryniscus cupreuscapularis is a species of toad in the family Bufonidae.
It is endemic to Argentina.
Its natural habitats are subtropical or tropical moist shrubland, subtropical or tropical seasonally wet or flooded lowland grassland, and intermittent freshwater marshes.
It is threatened by habitat loss.

References

cupreuscapularis
Amphibians of Argentina
Endemic fauna of Argentina
Taxonomy articles created by Polbot
Amphibians described in 2000